Philip C. Winters (born 1937) is a Republican politician who was elected to the Vermont House of Representatives in 1994. He represents the Orange-1 Representative District.  He did not run for reelection in 2014, and served from January 1995 to January 2015.

References

1937 births
Living people
Republican Party members of the Vermont House of Representatives
Place of birth missing (living people)